is a Japanese football player for Roasso Kumamoto.

He is the twin brother of Kyohei Kuroki.

Club statistics
Updated to 23 February 2018.

References

External links
Profile at Roasso Kumamoto

1989 births
Living people
Saga University alumni
Association football people from Kumamoto Prefecture
Japanese footballers
J1 League players
J2 League players
J3 League players
Sagan Tosu players
Roasso Kumamoto players
Association football midfielders
Twin sportspeople
Japanese twins